El Jetón is the final novel published by Salvadoran writer Arturo Ambrogi shortly before his death in 1936. It is considered a classic in Salvadoran literature.

According to one review (translated from Spanish):

Stories:

El Jetón
El Arreo
Cuando Brama la Barra
La Molienda
La Bruja
La Sacadera
Las Pescas del Miércoles de Ceniza
La Muerte del Rey Moro
La Siguanaba
El Chapulín
El Rezo del Santo
El Bruno
La Merca del Acordeón
Las Panchitas

References

External links
Biography of the author and extract from El Jetón

Salvadoran novels
Spanish-language novels
1936 novels
Books about El Salvador
Novels set in El Salvador
Works based on Latin American myths and legends